Stoney Slough National Wildlife Refuge is a  easement refuge with  owned in fee title and the remaining area of  covered by easement. The United States Fish and Wildlife Service fee title of 1,120 acres allows some wetland and upland management. Water management using a series of canals and a water control structure is possible when there is sufficient spring runoff. The Refuge is a popular stopover for snow geese and white-fronted geese during fall migration.

The refuge was established by Executive Orders during the Franklin D. Roosevelt administration and was set aside as "a refuge and breeding grounds for migratory birds and other wildlife." The refuge is maintained by the Valley City Wetland Management District and is a part of the Arrowwood National Wildlife Refuge Complex.

Potential wildlife observation and photography opportunities are available from roads adjacent to and through the Refuge.

See also
 List of National Wildlife Refuges

Notes

External links
  - includes Stoney Slough National Wildlife Refuge
 Oh Ranger: Stoney Slough National Wildlife Refuge

National Wildlife Refuges in North Dakota
Easement refuges in North Dakota
Protected areas of Barnes County, North Dakota
Protected areas established in 1941
Wetlands of North Dakota
Landforms of Barnes County, North Dakota